WITC (88.9 FM) was a radio station broadcasting a variety format. Licensed to Cazenovia, New York, United States, the station was owned by Cazenovia College.

History
WITC was licensed April 10, 1978. It was a 10-watt station at 90.9 MHz. The station moved to 88.9 in 1987. Its license was cancelled on February 9, 2022.

References

External links

FCC History Cards for WITC

ITC
Cazenovia College
Radio stations established in 1978
1978 establishments in New York (state)
Radio stations disestablished in 2022
2022 disestablishments in New York (state)
Defunct radio stations in the United States
ITC
Cazenovia, New York